The Ministry of Labour and Social Welfare of Uruguay is the ministry of the Government of Uruguay that is responsible for conducting and carrying out policies related to labor activity in the country, as well as supervising social and food benefits.

This government department is also responsible for acting as mediator of the parties when there are internal conflicts, and defending the rights of workers and enforcing them by their employers. It is the responsibility of the ministry to control the security conditions in the jobs. The Ministry is headquartered in the Juncal Street in Ciudad Vieja, Montevideo. The current Minister of Labour and Social Welfare is Pablo Mieres, who has held the position since 1 March 2020.

History 
The existence of a government department dealing with labor and social security issues dates back to the creation of the Ministry of Industry, Labor and Public Instruction, created on 12 March 1907 by President Claudio Williman by dividing the former Ministry of Development. On 4 March 1912, President José Batlle y Ordoñez reorganized the Ministry of Industry, Labor and Public Instruction, the Ministry of Industry, Labor and Communications and the Ministry of Justice and Public Instruction.

A new cabinet reshuffle took place under the de facto government of Gabriel Terra in 1936, organizing the Ministry of Industry and Labor and the Ministry of Public Instruction and Social Welfare. After the constitutional reform produced in March 1967, the Ministry of Labour was created, the first holder of the position was Enrique Vescovi, while Héctor Hugo Barbagelata was the first undersecretary. In a final ministerial adjustment in 1974, it generates, from these two departments, the Ministry of Industry and Commerce, Ministry of Culture and Ministry of Labour and Social Welfare.

Source:

List of Ministers of Labor and Social Welfare of Uruguay 

List of Ministers of Labor and Social Affairs of Uruguay since 1935:

¹ Ministers of the Military-Civic government (1973–1985).

External links 

 Uruguayan Labor and Social Affairs (in Spanish only)

References 

 
Labour and Social Welfare
Uruguay
Uruguay
Economy of Uruguay